Antennophorus is a genus of mites in the family Antennophoridae. It was described by Haller in 1877.

Species
 Antennophorus boveni (Wisniewski & Hirschmann, 1992)
 Antennophorus grandis Berlese, 1903 - is an ectoparasite to ants of the species Lasius flavus.
 Antennophorus goesswaldi (Wisniewski & Hirschmann, 1992)
 Antennophorus krantzi (Wisniewski & Hirschmann, 1992)
 Antennophorus pavani (Wisniewski & Hirschmann, 1992)
 Antennophorus uhlmanni (Haller, 1877)

References

Mesostigmata